Peter Wadhams ScD (born 14 May 1948), is emeritus professor of Ocean Physics, and Head of the Polar Ocean Physics Group
in the Department of Applied Mathematics and Theoretical Physics, University of Cambridge. He is best known for his work on sea ice.

Career
Wadhams has been the leader of 40 polar field expeditions.

Wadhams advocates for the use of climate engineering to mitigate climate change.

Attempting to estimate when the Arctic Ocean will be "ice-free", Wadhams in 2014 predicted that by 2020 "summer sea ice to disappear,"  Wadhams and several others have noted that climate model predictions have been overly conservative regarding sea ice decline.

In 2021, Wadhams is the Chairman of Science Committee for Extreme E.

Honours and awards
1977 W. S. Bruce Medal for his oceanographic investigations, especially in studying the behaviour of pack ice near Spitsbergen, the North Pole and off east Greenland.
1987 Polar Medal.
1990 Italgas Prize for Environmental Sciences

See also

Global warming controversy
List of climate scientists
Shutdown of thermohaline circulation

References

External links 

 Homepage, including bio

1948 births
Alumni of Churchill College, Cambridge
British physicists
Living people
Cambridge mathematicians
Fellows of Clare Hall, Cambridge
People of the Scott Polar Research Institute